The 2021 International Swimming League was the third edition of the International Swimming League, a professional swimming league, established in 2019. It comprised ten teams composed of both women and men. The league, due to COVID-19 pandemic travel restrictions, consisted of a total of eighteen short course swimming meets, called matches, spanning four stages of competition and held in two locations. In each match, swimmers from four different teams competed in individual, relay, and skins events. The ten regular season matches and one play in match took place in the city of Naples, Italy. The six play off matches in the semifinals stage of competition took place in the city of Eindhoven, Netherlands, as did the final match.

The France-based Energy Standard won the Final Match, with the Most Valuable Player award going to Sarah Sjöström of the same team.

Schedule
The schedule consisted of eleven regular season and play in meets in Naples, followed by six Semifinals and the Final Match in Eindhoven.

Ranking

All individual events that were competed during the ISL season were ranked. Each ISL athlete had a ranking for the event(s) in which they competed, and each athlete was either awarded a "gem" or a "star" based on their rankings.

Teams

ISL teams were allowed a maximum roster size of 38 athletes for the 2021 season, with a suggested size of each club's traveling roster of 30 (15 men and 15 women). Each club had a captain and a vice-captain of different gender.

Standings

2021 ISL Final Match

2021 ISL Play Offs

2021 ISL Play In Match 
The team in yellow are qualified to the Play Offs.

2021 ISL Regular season
The top two finishers of the second edition of the league, Cali Condors and Energy Standard, did not compete against each other during any regular season match.

Event winners

50 m freestyle

100 m freestyle

200 m freestyle

400 m freestyle

50 m backstroke

100 m backstroke

200 m backstroke

50 m breaststroke

100 m breaststroke

200 m breaststroke

50 m butterfly

100 m butterfly

200 m butterfly

100 m individual medley

200 m individual medley

400 m individual medley

50 m skins

4x100 m freestyle relay

4x100 m medley relay

4x100 m mixed medley relay

World Records
The following world records were set as a part of competition during the 2021 International Swimming League.

References

International Swimming League
2021 in swimming